Chilean singer Mon Laferte has released 8 studio albums, 32 singles and three promotional singles.

In 2003, Laferte, then known as Monserrat Bustamante, released her first studio album, La Chica de Rojo. In 2007, Laferte decided to start a new chapter in her musical career by moving to Mexico City from Chile, recording an album in 2009, which was released two years later titled Desechable. In 2013, she released her third album, Tornasol. She received media attention in 2015 with her single "Tu falta de querer" from the album Mon Laferte, Vol.1. Laferte released her fifth album La Trenza, her most acclaimed album to date, in 2017. Her single with Colombian rock star Juanes, "Amárrame" won the Best Alternative Song award at the 18th Latin GRAMMYs. During the year 2018, Mon worked on her sixth studio album, Norma, which was recorded in a single session in studio A of Capitol Studios of Los Angeles, California, United States.

Albums

Studio albums

Live albums

Singles

As lead artist

As featured artist

Other appearances

Promotional singles

Notes

References

External links 
 Mon Laferte at AllMusic
 
 

Latin pop music discographies
Discographies of Chilean artists